Ageli is a settlement in the Xanthi regional unit of Greece. It is located northeast of Toxotes and is approximately 14 kilometers from Xanthi.

External links
Greek Travel Pages - Ageli

Populated places in Xanthi (regional unit)